The 2001 Australian Sports Sedan Championship was an Australian motor racing competition for Group 3D Sports Sedans. It was sanctioned by the Confederation of Australian Motor Sport and was the seventeenth Australian Sports Sedan Championship.

The championship was won by Tony Ricciardello driving an Alfa Romeo GTV

Calendar
The championship was contested over a five round series with two races per round.

Results

References

External links
 Race Result Archive - 2001 Retrieved from www.natsoft.biz on 20 November 2008
 2001 ASSC Image Gallery Retrieved from web.archive.org on 20 November 2008

National Sports Sedan Series
Sports Sedan Championship